"Imagine" is a song by English singer Shola Ama, released as the second single from her 1999 second studio album In Return. It was produced by Fred Jerkins III and written by Jerkins, Harvey Mason Jr., LaShawn Daniels, and Ama. In April 2000, the song reached number 24 on the UK Singles Chart and number one on the UK Dance Singles Chart, due to the popular garage remix by Club Asylum.

NME included the remix of "Imagine" in their "25 essential UK garage anthems" list.

Track listings
UK CD single
"Imagine" (Darkchild Radio Edit) – 3:47
"Imagine" (D'Influence Futurama Mix) – 6:10
"Imagine" (Spa Remix Radio Edit) – 3:45
"Imagine" (Curtis Lynch Jnr Wicked Remix) – 3:46

UK 12" single
A1. "Imagine" (Darkchild Radio Edit) – 3:47
A2. "Imagine" (Spa Remix Radio Edit) – 3:45
B1. "Imagine" (Asylum Remix) – 5:42
B2. "Imagine" (Curtis Lynch Jnr Wicked Remix) – 3:46

UK 12" ("Imagine (The Garage Mixes Including Asylum Mix)")
A1. "Imagine" (Asylum Remix) – 5:42
A2. "Imagine" (Asylum Dub) – 5:40
B. "Imagine" (Ed Case and Carl H Remix) – 5:26

UK 12" ("Imagine (The Garage Remixes)")
A1. "Imagine" (Asylum Steppers Vocal Mix)
A2. "Imagine" (Ed Case & Carl H Remix)
B1. "Imagine" (The Asylum Remix)
B2. "Imagine" (The Asylum Dub)

Charts

References

1999 songs
2000 singles
Shola Ama songs
UK garage songs
Songs written by Fred Jerkins III
Songs written by Harvey Mason Jr.
Songs written by LaShawn Daniels
Song recordings produced by Rodney Jerkins
Warner Music Group singles